3D cell culturing by magnetic levitation method (MLM) is the application of growing 3D tissue by inducing cells treated with magnetic nanoparticle assemblies in spatially varying magnetic fields using neodymium magnetic drivers and promoting cell to cell interactions by levitating the cells up to the air/liquid interface of a standard petri dish. The magnetic nanoparticle assemblies consist of magnetic iron oxide nanoparticles, gold nanoparticles, and the polymer polylysine. 3D cell culturing is scalable, with the capability for culturing 500 cells to millions of cells or from single dish to high-throughput low volume systems. Once magnetized cultures are generated, they can also be used as the building block material, or the "ink", for the magnetic 3D bioprinting process.

Overview
Standard monolayer cell culturing on tissue culture plastic has notably improved our understanding of basic cell biology, but it does not replicate the complex 3D architecture of in vivo tissue, and it can significantly modify cell properties. This often compromises experiments in basic life science, leads to misleading drug-screening results on efficacy and toxicity, and produces cells that may lack the characteristics needed for developing tissue regeneration therapies.

The future of cell culturing for fundamental studies and biomedical applications lies in the creation of multicellular structure and organization in three-dimensions. Many schemes for 3D culturing are being developed or marketed, such as bio-reactors or protein-based gel environments.

A 3D cell culturing system known as the Bio-Assembler uses biocompatible polymer-based reagents to deliver magnetic nanoparticles to individual cells so that an applied magnetic driver can levitate cells off the bottom of the cell culture dish and rapidly bring cells together near the air-liquid interface. This initiates cell-cell interactions in the absence of any artificial surface or matrix. Magnetic fields are designed to rapidly form 3D multicellular structures in as little as a few hours, including expression of extracellular matrix proteins. The morbius, protein expression, and response to exogenous agents of resulting tissue show great similarity to in vivo results.

History
3D cell culturing by magnetic levitation method (MLM) was developed from collaboration between scientists at Rice University and University of Texas MD Anderson Cancer Center in 2008. Since then, this technology has been licensed and commercialized by Nano3D Biosciences.

The magnetic levitation process

Above is a picture showing 3D cell culturing through magnetic levitation with the Bio-Assembler cell culturing system. (A) A magnetic iron oxide nanoparticle assembly known as Nano shuttle is added and dispersed over cells and the mixture is incubated. (B) After incubation with Nanoshuttle, cells are detached and transferred to a petri dish. (C) A magnetic drive is then placed on top of a petri dish top. (D) The magnetic field causes cells to rise to the air–medium interface. (E) Human umbilical vein endothelial cells (HUVEC) levitated for 60 minutes (left images) and 4 hours (right images) (Scale bar, 50 μm). The onset of cell-cell interaction takes place as soon as cells levitate, and 3D structures start to form. At 1 hour, the cells are still relatively dispersed, but they are already showing some signs of stretching. Formation of 3D structures is visible after 4 hours of levitation (arrows).

Protein expression
Protein expression in levitated cultures shows striking similarity to in vivo patterns. N-cadherin expression in levitated human glioblastoma cells was identical to the expression seen in human tumour xenografts grown in immunodeficient mice, while standard 2D culture showed much weaker expression that did not match xenograft distribution as shown in the picture below. The transmembrane protein N-cadherin is often used as an indicator of in-vivo-like tissue assembly in 3D culturing.

In the picture above, distribution of N-cadherin (red) and nuclei (blue) in human brain cancer mouse xenograft (left, human brain cancer cells grown in a mouse brain), brain cancer cells cultured by 3D magnetic levitation for 48 h. (middle), and cells cultured on a glass slide cover slip (2D, right). The 2D system shows N-cadherin in the cytoplasm and nucleus and notably absent from the membrane, while in the levitated culture and mouse, N-cadherin is clearly concentrated in the membrane, and also present in cytoplasm and cell junctions.

Applications

Co-culturing, magnetic manipulation, and invasion assays
One of the challenges in generating in vivo like cultures or tissue in vitro is the difficulty in co-culturing different cell types. Because of the ability of 3D cell culturing by magnetic levitation to bring cells together, co-culturing different cell types is possible. Co-culturing of different cell types can be achieved at the onset of levitation, by mixing different cell types in before levitation or by magnetically guiding 3D cultures in an invasion assay format.

The unique ability to manipulate cells and shape tissue magnetically offers new possibilities for controlled co-culturing and invasion assays. Co-culturing in a realistic tissue architecture is critical for accurately modeling in vivo conditions, such as for increasing the accuracy of cellular assays as shown in the figure below.

Shown in the picture above is an invasion assay of magnetically levitated multicellular spheroids. Fluorescence images of human glioblastoma (GBM) cells (green; GFP-expressing cells) and normal human astrocytes (NHA) (red; mCherry-labelled) cultured separately and then magnetically guided together (left, time 0). Invasion of GBM into NHA in 3D culture provides a powerful new assay for basic cancer biology and drug screening (right, 12h to 252h).

Vascular simulation with stem cells
By facilitating assembly of different populations of cells using the MLM, consistent generation of organoids termed adipospheres capable of simulating the complex intercellular interactions of endogenous white adipose tissue (WAT) can be achieved.

Co-culturing 3T3-L1 pre-adipocytes in 3D with murine endothelial bEND.3 cells creates a vascular-like network assembly with concomitant lipogenesis in perivascular cells. See figure below.

In addition to cell lines, WAT organogenesis can be simulated from primary cells.

Adipocyte-depleted stromal vascular fraction (SVF) containing adipose stromal cells (ASC), endothelial cells, and infiltrating leukocyte derived from mouse white adipose tissue (WAT) were cultured in 3D. This revealed organoids striking in hierarchical organization with distinct capsule and internal large vessel-like structures lined with endothelial cells, as well as perivascular localization of ASC.

Upon adipogenesis induction of either 3T3-L1 adipospheres or adipospheres derived from SVF, the cells efficiently formed large lipid droplets typical of white adipocytes in vivo, whereas only smaller lipid droplet formation is achievable in 2D. This indicates intercellular signalling that better recapitulates WAT organogenesis.

This MLM for 3D co-culturing creates adipospheres appropriate for WAT modeling ex vivo and provides a new platform for functional screens to identify molecules bioactive toward individual adipose cell populations. It can also be adopted for WAT transplantation applications and aid other approaches to WAT-based cell therapy.

Organized co-culturing to create in vivo-like tissue
Using the MagPen (a Nano3D Biosciences, Inc. product), organized 3D co-cultures similar to native tissue architecture can be rapidly created. Endothelial cells (PEC), smooth muscle cells (SMC), fibroblasts (PF), and epithelial cells (EpiC) cultured with the Bio-Assembler can be sequentially layered in a drag-and-drop manner to create bronchioles that maintain phenotype and induce extracellular matrix formation.

Cell types cultured
Listed below are the cell types (primary and cell lines) that have been successfully cultured by the magnetic levitation method. The second table is the same but with images included. More images are available at Nano3D Biosciences, Inc.

Same table as above, but with images.

References

Cell biology
Cell culture
Biotechnology
Nanoparticles
Molecular biology techniques